Girard "Gerry" McDonald (born March 18, 1958) is an American former professional ice hockey player who played eight games in the National Hockey League (NHL) for the Hartford Whalers between 1981 and 1984. He grew up on Elmlawn Road in Braintree, Massachusetts. Gerry graduated from Braintree High School in 1976 and North Adams State College in 1980.

His son, Colin, is a hockey player, formerly playing for the Bridgeport Sound Tigers, the AHL affiliate of the New York Islanders as well as several other teams.

Gerry is the Operations Manager of Gengras Motors Cars in East Hartford, Connecticut. He has been in the automotive retail business for over thirty years.

Career statistics

Regular season and playoffs

External links 
 

1958 births
Living people
American men's ice hockey defensemen
Binghamton Whalers players
Hartford Whalers announcers
Hartford Whalers players
Ice hockey players from Massachusetts
Massachusetts College of Liberal Arts alumni
New Haven Nighthawks players
Sportspeople from Weymouth, Massachusetts
Tulsa Oilers (1964–1984) players
Undrafted National Hockey League players